Love's Savage Fury is a 1979 American TV film.

Plot
In the American Civil War, a Southern belle survives a Union prison.

Cast
Jennifer O'Neill
Raymond Burr
Perry King
Robert Reed
Connie Stevens
Ed Lauter

Production
Jaclyn Smith was meant to star but she pulled out after reading the script. Filming started March 22, 1979.

Reception
It was the third highest rated show of the week.

References

External links

Love's Savage Fury at TCMDB

1979 television films
1979 films
ABC network original films
American television films
Films directed by Joseph Hardy (director)
1970s English-language films